Egor Konstantinovich Yakovlev (born 17 September 1991) is a Russian professional ice hockey defenceman for Metallurg Magnitogorsk of the Kontinental Hockey League (KHL). He previously played in the National Hockey League (NHL) with the New Jersey Devils.

Internationally, Yakovlev was part of the Russian team on numerous occasions, winning the 2014 IIHF World Championships, as well as the gold medal at the 2018 Winter Olympics.

Playing career
Yakovlev made his Kontinental Hockey League (KHL) debut playing with Ak Bars Kazan during the 2010–11 KHL season. On 20 October 2011, Yakovlev signed a three-year deal with Lokomotiv Yaroslavl. He was the first player signed by the club after the 2011 Lokomotiv Yaroslavl plane crash that killed the majority of its roster six weeks earlier. On 7 June 2015, he signed a three-year contract with KHL powerhouse SKA Saint Petersburg.

On 21 May 2018, Yakovlev signed a one-year, entry-level contract with the New Jersey Devils of the National Hockey League (NHL). Yakovlev began the 2018–19 season with the Devils American Hockey League affiliate, the Binghamton Devils. He made his NHL debut on 11 November against the Winnipeg Jets and scored his first career NHL goal on 3 December in a 5–1 loss to the Tampa Bay Lightning. Yakovlev split the season between New Jersey and Binghamton, finishing with 2 goals and 7 points in 25 games in the NHL.

As an impending free agent, Yakovlev left the Devils in order to return to continue his career in the KHL, signing a two-year contract with hometown club, Metallurg Magnitogorsk, on 15 May 2019.

International play

 

On 23 January 2022, Yakovlev was named to the roster to represent Russian Olympic Committee athletes at the 2022 Winter Olympics.

Career statistics

Regular season and playoffs

International

Awards and honors

References

External links
 

1991 births
Living people
Ak Bars Kazan players
Binghamton Devils players
Ice hockey players at the 2018 Winter Olympics
Ice hockey players at the 2022 Winter Olympics
JHC Bars players
Lokomotiv Yaroslavl players
Medalists at the 2018 Winter Olympics
Medalists at the 2022 Winter Olympics
Metallurg Magnitogorsk players
New Jersey Devils players
Olympic gold medalists for Olympic Athletes from Russia
Olympic silver medalists for the Russian Olympic Committee athletes
Olympic ice hockey players of Russia
Olympic medalists in ice hockey
People from Magnitogorsk
Russian ice hockey defencemen
SKA Saint Petersburg players
Undrafted National Hockey League players
Universiade medalists in ice hockey
Russian expatriate sportspeople in the United States
Universiade gold medalists for Russia
Competitors at the 2011 Winter Universiade
Sportspeople from Chelyabinsk Oblast